The Bangabandhu Krirashebi Kalyan Foundation is a welfare foundation, owned and supported by the Bangladesh government, for athletes in Bangladesh. It is under the Ministry of Youth and Sports.

History
The formation of Bangabandhu Krirashebi Kalyan Foundation was approved by President Sheikh Mujibur Rahman on 6 August 1975. For a brief while it was called Bangladesh Krirabid Kalyan Trust. In 2009, the Government led by Sheikh Hasina changed the name back to Bangabandhu Krirashebi Kalyan Foundation. The foundation provides athletic scholarships.

References

1975 establishments in Bangladesh
Organisations based in Dhaka
Government agencies of Bangladesh